Nat Geo Kids was a Latin American pay television channel targeting children ages 3 to 11, owned by Disney Channels Worldwide and National Geographic Partners, a joint venture between The Walt Disney Company and National Geographic Society.

The channel was originally launched on 1 July 2005 as Fox Life, but it was rebranded on 4 November 2013 as MundoFox. On 1 July 2017, the channel was again rebranded as Nat Geo Kids. Its Brazilian feed was launched on 4 October 2017.

On January 10, 2022, it was announced that Nat Geo Kids would close on March 31 in the region, along with several other sister networks.

References

Children's television networks
Spanish-language television stations
Television channels and stations established in 2017
National Geographic Partners
The Walt Disney Company Latin America
Television channels and stations disestablished in 2022